Dead Register is an American gothic rock band from Atlanta, Georgia.

History
M. Chvasta, formerly of Light Pupil Dilate and Palaces, playing 6-string bass, formed the band with Avril Che (keyboards) in 2013. Chad Williams of Magnapop later joined on drums in 2014. The band released a three-song demo, TRVNS BLK, in 2014, and then opted to self-release their debut LP, Fiber, on cassette and CD in 2016. Throne Records announced it will be releasing Fiber on vinyl in 2017.  In addition, Che handles all graphic design work for the band's material and marketing and has served as director for their first two music videos. The band's name is a reference to their material being primarily in a low register.

Discography

Albums
 TRVNS BLK (demo) (Self-released, 2014)
 Fiber (Avr Records, 2016)
 Captive (Avr Records, 2018)

Videography 
 Fiber (2016)
 Grave (2016)

Related bands
 Magnapop - Chad Williams
 Light Pupil Dilate - M. Chvasta

References

External links
  Interview at In The Now Magazine
  Press release at Throne Records

Musical groups established in 2013
Alternative rock groups from Georgia (U.S. state)
Musical groups from Atlanta
2013 establishments in Georgia (U.S. state)